In geometry, the snub tritetratrigonal tiling or snub order-8 triangular tiling is a uniform tiling of the hyperbolic plane. It has Schläfli symbols of s{(3,4,3)} and s{3,8}.

Images 
Drawn in chiral pairs:

Symmetry
The alternated construction from the truncated order-8 triangular tiling has 2 colors of triangles and achiral symmetry. It has Schläfli symbol of s{3,8}.

Related polyhedra and tiling

References
 John H. Conway, Heidi Burgiel, Chaim Goodman-Strass, The Symmetries of Things 2008,  (Chapter 19, The Hyperbolic Archimedean Tessellations)

See also

Square tiling
Uniform tilings in hyperbolic plane
List of regular polytopes

External links 

 Hyperbolic and Spherical Tiling Gallery
 KaleidoTile 3: Educational software to create spherical, planar and hyperbolic tilings
 Hyperbolic Planar Tessellations, Don Hatch

Hyperbolic tilings
Isogonal tilings
Order-8 tilings
Snub tilings
Triangular tilings
Uniform tilings